Zolotkovsky is a rural locality (a passing loop) in Posyolok Zolotkovo, Gus-Khrustalny District, Vladimir Oblast, Russia. The population was 479 as of 2010. There are 12 streets.

Geography 
Zolotkovsky is located 47 km southeast of Gus-Khrustalny (the district's administrative centre) by road. Zolotkovo is the nearest rural locality.

References 

Rural localities in Gus-Khrustalny District